Blueberry Hill is a 1988 American coming of age drama film directed by Strathford Hamilton and starring Jennifer Rubin.

Premise
A small-town girl in the 1950s turns to a woman jazz singer for advice and comfort after her musician father dies suddenly. She discovers she has inherited her father's musical talents and learns some disturbing family secrets.

References

External links

1988 films
1988 drama films
American drama films
1980s English-language films
Metro-Goldwyn-Mayer films
1988 directorial debut films
Films directed by Strathford Hamilton
1980s American films